Aqsaqal or aksakal (literally meaning "white beard" in Kipchak languages) metaphorically refers to the male elders, the old and wise of the community in parts of Central Asia, the Caucasus and Bashkortostan. Traditionally, an aqsaqal was the leader of a village or aul until the Soviet times. Acting as advisors or judges, these elders have or had a role in politics and the justice system in countries and tribes.  For instance, there are aksakals courts in Kyrgyzstan. In Uzbekistan, which has traditionally been a more urban society (the Uzbeks being sarts or town-dwellers, as opposed to Yörüks), cities are divided up into mahallas. Each mahalla has an aqsaqal who acts as the district leader.

Redevelopment of the aqsaqal courts in Kyrgyzstan
In 1995, then-President of Kyrgyzstan Askar Akayev announced a decree to revitalize the aqsaqal courts. The courts would have jurisdiction over property, torts and family law. The aqsaqal courts were eventually included under Article 92 of the Kyrgyz constitution. As of 2006, there were approximately 1,000 aqsaqal courts throughout Kyrgyzstan, including in the capital of Bishkek. Akaev linked the development of these courts to the rekindling of Kyrgyz national identity. In a 2005 speech, he connected the courts back to the country's nomadic past and extolled how the courts expressed the Kyrgyz ability of self-governance.

See also
Customary law

References

Turkish culture
Kyrgyzstani culture
Uzbekistani culture
Kazakhstani culture
Caucasus
Customary legal systems